Dell'Aquila is an Italian surname. Notable people with the surname include:

 Antonio Dell'Aquila (born 1957), Italian rower
 Armando Dell'Aquila (born 1987), Italian rower
 Vito Dell'Aquila (born 2000), Italian Taekwondo athlete

Italian-language surnames